Helmut Mayrhofer is an Austrian lichenologist. He is known for his expertise on the lichen family Physciaceae and his studies of the lichen flora of the Balkan Peninsula, the Alps, and other regions.

Biography

Helmut Mayrhofer was born in 1953 in Aich, a village in Austria. He went to secondary school in Gröbming and Graz, and then to the University of Graz. He graduated from there in 1976 with a master's degree, having submitted a thesis titled "Flechten auf Rhododendron ferrugineum" ("Lichens on Rhododendron ferrugineum"). While working as a schoolteacher, Mayrhofer was also working on his doctoral degree, under the supervision of Josef Poelt. He defended his thesis, titled "Die saxicolen Arten der Flechtengattungen Rinodina und Rinodinella in der Alten Welt" ("The saxicolous species of the lichen genera Rinodina and Rinodinella in the Old World) in 1988, receiving his venia docendi (Doctor of Science) in plant systematics. That year he became a university lecturer; eventually he became an associate professor in 1995, and held this position until he retired in 2018. As of that year, he had supervised 10 PhD students and 38 masters and diploma thesis candidates.

Mayrhofer served twice (1999–2010 and 2013–2017) as the head of the Institute of Plant Sciences at the University of Graz. He was a visiting scholar at the University of Ljubljana in Slovenia from 2001 to 2003 and at the University of Montenegro in Podgorica from 2004 to 2006. He served as a member of the editorial boards of the journals Acta Botanica Croatica, Mycobiota, and Natura Montenegrina, and has been an editor of the journal Herzogia.

Research

Mayrhofer started research on crustose lichens beginning with his master's thesis. Through comparative light microscopical studies of lichens in Rinodina, he developed a typology of ascospores that proved to be useful in the identification of species in that genus, and later in the taxonomy of the entire family. As a result of his research, Rinodina went from being one of the least understood crustose lichen genera in the 1980s to one of the most studied. He later included other characters such as secondary chemistry, ascus shapes, ascospore ontogeny, and molecular phylogenetics to help resolve taxonomic issues in the Physciaceae.

Another research interest of Mayrhofer has been documenting lichen biodiversity in various locations. Together with his students, and sometimes in collaboration with other colleagues, he has catalogued the lichen biota of several countries in the Balkan Peninsula, the Mediterranean islands of Cyprus and Crete, as well as the Asian countries of Armenia and Tajikistan. Mayrhofer has explored extensively several mountainous areas in Austria and Slovenia and has compiled an annotated inventory of lichens in the Alps.

Eponymy

Several lichen species have been named in Mayrhofer's honour, including:

Fuscidea mayrhoferi ; Lecanora mayrhoferi ; Rinodina mayrhoferi  (1984); Skyttea mayrhoferi ; Unguiculariopsis helmutii ; Xanthoparmelia mayrhoferi ; Acarospora mayrhoferi ; Cratiria mayrhoferi ; Dimelaena mayrhoferiana ; Lecanora helmutii ; Stigmidium mayrhoferi  Tremella mayrhoferi ; and Usnea mayrhoferi .

Selected publications

A compilation of Mayrhofer's scientific publications up until 2018 was given in the Bilovitz et al. tribute article. Some of his major works include:

See also
 :Category:Taxa named by Helmut Mayrhofer

References

1953 births
Living people
Austrian lichenologists
Austrian taxonomists
People from Liezen District
University of Graz alumni